The  opened in Shari, Hokkaidō, Japan in 1978 to mark the 100th anniversary of the municipality's foundation. The collection and displays relate to the natural and human history of the Shiretoko Peninsula.

In 1993, the  opened next door, with exhibits relating to Taketomi, Hirosaki, and the Shiretoko Neputa festival.

See also
 Shiretoko National Park
 Abashiri Quasi-National Park
 Sharidake Prefectural Natural Park
 List of Natural Monuments of Japan (Hokkaidō)
 Aomori Nebuta Matsuri

References

External links

 Shiretoko Museum

Shari, Hokkaido
Museums in Hokkaido
1978 establishments in Japan
Museums established in 1978